The Zomi Baptist Convention of Myanmar was an organized and formed in 1995 as a breakaway from the Zomi Baptist Convention (now known as the Chin Baptist Convention).

History 
The Zomi Baptist Convention was established in Burma in 1952, with its first Chairman was being Rev'd ST. Gou Hau.

During the triennial meeting of the Zomi Baptist Convention in Khuasak in April 1995, four associations broke away from the convention to form the new Zomi Baptist Convention of Myanmar: Tonzang Township Baptist Association (TTBA), Tedim Baptist Association (TBA), Kale Zomi Baptist Association (KZBA), and Tamu Valley Baptist Association (TVBA). The new organization associated with the Southern Baptist Convention. However, of the four associations, the Tedim Baptist Association later withdrew from the new organization and remained under the Myanmar Baptist Convention.
Later it added 4 more associations which are the Zanggam Zomi Baptist Association (ZZBA), Cikha Township Baptist Association (CTBA), the Heilei Baptist Association (HBA), Tedim Baptist Churches Association (TBCA) and affiliated with Zomi Baptist Churches of America (ZBCA).

Baptist World Alliance Welcomes New Member Body
Zomi Baptist Convention of Myanmar
Zomi Baptist Convention of Myanmar was welcomed as the 240th member body of the Baptist World Alliance during this year's annual gathering in Nassau. (Brian Kaylor/Word&Way)

NASSAU, THE BAHAMAS — During the 2019 Annual Gathering of the Baptist World Alliance (BWA), the General Council voted unanimously on Wednesday (July 11) to approve the membership application of the Zomi Baptist Convention of Myanmar (ZBCM), making it the 240th member body within the 114-year-old organization.

Established in 1995, ZBCM has 27,964 members in 190 churches and has convenient offices located in Kalaymyo, Myanmar. Their leadership includes President Tuan Khan Mung and General Secretary Lang Za Kap.

“In his report, our President stated that nothing brings him more joy than baptizing new believers. That’s the way I feel when I bring the possibility of a new member before this BWA body,” said Roy Medley, chairperson of the BWA Membership Committee. “There’s a sense of joy that there are those who want to join us and become part of this movement that is blessing so many around the world.”

As required within the application process, ZBCM submitted supporting documents that included a statement of faith, organizational history, convention constitution, and registration documentation with the Ministry of Religious Affairs and Culture. During the BWA application review process, ZBCM also became a member of the Asia Pacific Baptist Federation (APBF), one of six regional BWA fellowships.

Facing repression from their government and its military, thousands of the Zomi people have fled to countries like Malaysia and India as refugees. In these communities and those that remain within Myanmar, the Zomi people have remained faithful in growing and developing churches.

“Their faith is strong. Their commitment to Jesus Christ is solid,” said Medley. “They desire to expand their witness and their participation by joining this Baptist World Alliance.”

Rev. Dr. Gin Khan Khual,
Rev. Dr. Gin Khan Khual, Consultant and Superintendent of the Zomi Baptist Convention of Myanmar, shares his excitement about joining the BWA.

Representatives of the Zomi Baptist Convention of Myanmar traveled to Nassau, The Bahamas, to participate in the 2019 BWA Annual Gathering and to be part of the General Council vote on Wednesday. After the unanimous vote of approval, ZBCM Consultant and Superintendent Gin Khan Khual addressed the Council.

“Today the Lord has blessed the Zomi Baptist Convention of Myanmar to become a member of the Baptist World Alliance and to participate in this conference,” said Khual. “This is the result of much prayer. It has been a long journey, and today is the day we reach our final destination.”

He expressed their excitement about contributing to the global work of the BWA in areas of mission, evangelism, and theological reflection and their eagerness to welcome members of the BWA family to their country.

“We invite you to come and bless the people of ZBCM and to see the life of your Baptist family in another corner of the world,” said Khual.

ZBCM is the second member body to join the BWA during the leadership of BWA General Secretary Elijah Brown, with the St. Vincent Baptist Convention from St. Vincent and the Grenadines being approved for membership in 2018.

“I join with BWA President Paul Msiza and the entire BWA family in welcoming the Zomi Baptist Convention of Myanmar,” said Brown. “We eagerly anticipate what God will do as we partner together in our mission to impact the world for Christ.”

Members of the Zomi Baptist Convention of Myanmar
Members of the Zomi Baptist Convention of Myanmar pictured with BWA General Secretary Elijah Brown, BWA President Paul Msiza, Asia Pacific Baptist Federation General Secretary Vee Tetseo, and BWA Membership Committee Chairperson Roy Medley.

References

Baptist Christianity in Myanmar
Baptist denominations in Asia